Angela Evans Smith, Baroness Smith of Basildon,  (born 7 January 1959) is a British politician and life peer serving as Leader of the Opposition in the House of Lords since 2015. A member of the Labour and Co-operative parties, she was Member of Parliament (MP) for Basildon from 1997 to 2010.

Smith served in government as an Assistant Whip from 2001 to 2002 and a Parliamentary Under-Secretary of State from 2002 to 2007. She became Parliamentary Private Secretary to the Prime Minister, Gordon Brown, in 2007 and served until her appointment as Minister of State for the Third Sector in 2009. Smith lost her seat to the Conservatives at the 2010 general election, contesting the reformed South Basildon and East Thurrock constituency. She was appointed to the House of Lords shortly after her defeat, where she became Shadow Deputy Chief Whip in 2012 and Shadow Leader in 2015.

Early life
Smith attended Pitsea Junior School and Chalvedon Comprehensive (later Chalvedon School) in Basildon, before reading Public Administration at Leicester Polytechnic, where she graduated as BA. In 1978, she married Nigel Smith, who has written a number of history books for Key Stage 3 and Key Stage 4.

From 1982 to 1983, Smith was a trainee accountant with the London Borough of Newham. She then worked for the League Against Cruel Sports from 1983 to 1995, becoming the head of Political and Public Relations. She was a political researcher from 1995 to 1997.

Smith was a member of Essex County Council from 1989 and a member of the Fire Authority for the County of Essex.

Parliamentary career

House of Commons 
Having previously contested Southend West in the 1987 General Election, Smith was selected to stand for election for Labour in Basildon nearly a decade later in December 1995 through an all-women shortlist. She was elected for Basildon at the 1997 general election, replacing the Conservative MP David Amess, who had moved to contest the nearby safer seat of Southend West, which Smith previously fought herself, when Basildon's boundaries were slightly redrawn, aware that his small majority was almost certainly going to be overturned by Labour. She was re-elected comfortably in 2001 and 2005.

In December 1997, Smith introduced the Private Member's Bill to minimise waste generation, and was successful in negotiating its passage through Parliament to become the Waste Minimisation Act 1998.

Smith was appointed a Government Whip in 2001, before being promoted to Parliamentary Under Secretary of State for Northern Ireland in October 2002. In 2006, she was moved to the Department for Communities and Local Government, with responsibility for Fire Services.

On 28 June 2007, Smith was appointed as a Parliamentary Private Secretary to the new Prime Minister Gordon Brown, entitling her to attend Cabinet. She gave up this role at the reshuffle of June 2009, to enter Government in the Cabinet Office as Minister of State for the Third Sector, when she was sworn of the Privy Council.

The old Basildon seat was abolished in the 2010 general election, and she stood for and lost the contest to the new South Basildon and East Thurrock constituency, which predominantly covered much of the area she represented in Parliament, to the Conservative candidate Stephen Metcalfe. Adverse boundary changes contributed to her defeat, as some of her voters were moved into the new Basildon and Billericay seat, whilst the new South Basildon seat took in strong Conservative wards in East Thurrock. Labour would have possibly held the old Basildon seat, and Smith herself said in a 2011 House of Lords debate: “Prior to my election to the other place in 1997, the constituency boundaries in my constituency were redrawn. For the 2010 election, the constituency boundaries were redrawn again, which may explain why I am in your Lordships' House and not in the other place”.

Expenses

In June 2009 Smith had to repay over £1,000 for wrongly claimed Council Tax expenses and service charges for her second property in Elephant and Castle. A review by Sir Thomas Legg uncovered further monies over-claimed by Baroness Smith making a total of £1,429 which she later returned.

House of Lords 

Smith was created a Life Peer as Baroness Smith of Basildon, of Basildon in the County of Essex, on 7 July 2010, following the 2010 Dissolution Honours List. She was introduced into the House of Lords the next day.

In the Lords, Smith was Labour Spokeswoman for Energy and Climate Change from 2010 to 2013, Northern Ireland from 2011 to 2012 and the Home Office from 2012 to 2015. She also served as Opposition Deputy Whip in the House of Lords from 2012 to 2015. On 27 May 2015, Smith was elected unopposed as Labour's Leader in the Lords, and so joined Harriet Harman's Shadow Cabinet.

In June 2016, Smith and Lords chief whip Lord Bassam of Brighton stated they would boycott shadow cabinet meetings while Jeremy Corbyn remained leader of the Labour Party, but returned to attending shadow cabinet four months later.

In September 2017, she was named at Number 71 in 'The 100 Most Influential People on the Left' by commentator Iain Dale.

Political positions 
An active supporter of animal welfare, Smith is a patron of Freedom for Animals, a charity campaigning for an end to the use of animals in circuses, zoos and the exotic pet trade.

References

External links
 Angela Smith: Electoral history and profile The Guardian
 Angela Smith MP TheyWorkForYou.com
 Voting Record – Angela Smith MP The Public Whip

|-

|-

1959 births
Living people
Alumni of De Montfort University
Female members of the Parliament of the United Kingdom for English constituencies
Labour Co-operative life peers
Life peeresses created by Elizabeth II
Labour Co-operative MPs for English constituencies
Members of Essex County Council
Members of the Privy Council of the United Kingdom
Northern Ireland Office junior ministers
People from Basildon
People from Hackney Central
Politics of the Borough of Basildon
UK MPs 1997–2001
UK MPs 2001–2005
UK MPs 2005–2010
20th-century British women politicians
21st-century British women politicians
Women government ministers in the United Kingdom
Parliamentary Private Secretaries to the Prime Minister
Women councillors in England